Nikos Christogeorgos (born 3 January 2000) is a Greek professional footballer who plays as a goalkeeper for Super League club OFI.

Career

Panathinaikos
Christogeorgos plays mainly as a goalkeeper and joined Panathinaikos from the team's youth ranks.

On 9 April 2021, he signed a new contract, running until the summer of 2024.

Career statistics

References

2000 births
Living people
Panathinaikos F.C. players
Panathinaikos F.C. B players
Super League Greece players
Super League Greece 2 players
Association football goalkeepers
Footballers from Athens
Greek footballers